Nathan Carter Newbold (December 27, 1871 – December 23, 1957) was the Director of Negro Education in North Carolina State Department of Public Instruction from 1913-1950. Duke University has a collection of his papers.

He edited Five North Carolina Negro Educators published in 1939. Barry F. Malone wrote a dissertation on him and education in Jim Crow era North Carolina.

The North Carolina Digital Collections have some of his correspondence available online. North Carolina Central University has a collection of his and his family's papers.

History
He was a school teacher and then served as an official supervising rural schools in North Carolina. He helped establish North Carolina's Division of Negro Education in 1921.

See also
 Annie Wealthy Holland

References

1871 births
1957 deaths
Schoolteachers from North Carolina
Educational administrators
African Americans and education